The 2022 Salute to the Oil Industry NAPA Auto Parts 150 was an ARCA Menards Series West race that was held on April 23, 2022 at Kern County Raceway Park in Bakersfield, California. It was contested over 150 laps on the  short track. It was the third race of the 2022 ARCA Menards Series West season. Cook Racing Technologies driver Landen Lewis, in his first West Series start, collected the victory.

Background

Entry list 

 (R) denotes rookie driver.
 (i) denotes driver who is ineligible for series driver points.

Practice/Qualifying

Starting Lineups

Race

Race results

References 

Salute to the Oil Industry
Salute to the Oil Industry NAPA Auto Parts 150
Salute to the Oil Industry